The following is a list of notable deaths in February 2007.

Entries for each day are listed alphabetically by surname. A typical entry lists information in the following sequence:
 Name, age, country of citizenship at birth, subsequent country of citizenship (if applicable), reason for notability, cause of death (if known), and reference.

February 2007

1
Whitney Balliett, 80, American jazz critic, cancer.
Ray Berres, 99, American baseball player who was second-oldest living major league player, pneumonia.
Emery Bopp, 82, American artist and art teacher.
Ahmad Abu Laban, 60, Egyptian-born Danish Muslim leader, key figure in the Muhammad cartoons controversy, cancer.
Gian Carlo Menotti, 95, Italian-born opera composer (Amahl and the Night Visitors).
Antonio María Javierre Ortas, 85, Spanish cardinal and prefect of the Congregation for Divine Worship (1992–1996), cardiac arrest.
Adelina Tattilo, 78, Italian founder of Playmen magazine.
Seri Wangnaitham, 70, Thai dancer, choreographer and national artist, heart failure.

2
Edmund Arnold, 93, American newspaper designer, pneumonia.
Vijay Arora, 62, Indian film and television actor, intestinal condition.
Loren Grey, 91, American educational psychologist and son of Zane Grey, age-related complications.
Billy Henderson, 67, American singer with The Spinners, diabetes.
Joe Hunter, 79, American pianist and bandleader of The Funk Brothers.
Terry McMillan, 53, American harmonica player.
Gisèle Pascal, 85, French actress.
Filippo Raciti, 40, Italian police officer, fatal injury by football hooligan.
Eric Von Schmidt, 75, American folk/blues singer-songwriter, stroke.
Masao Takemoto, 87, Japanese gymnast, gold medallist at 1960 Summer Olympics, bile duct cancer.
Shannon J. Wall, 87, American union official, president of the National Maritime Union (1973–1990).

3
Liliane Ackermann, 68, French Jewish community leader, writer and lecturer.
George Becker, 78, American president of United Steelworkers (1993–2001), prostate cancer.
Ralph de Toledano, 90, Moroccan-born American political columnist and author.
Stephan R. Epstein, 46, British professor of economic history at LSE, epileptic seizure.
Pedro Knight, 85, Cuban–American musician and husband of Celia Cruz.
Mohamed Sanni-Thomas, 79, Ghanaian Olympic athlete.
Devi Das Thakur, 77, Indian lawyer and politician, Governor of Assam (1990–1991).

4
Steve Barber, 68, American Major League Baseball pitcher, pneumonia.
Bauer, 81, Brazilian World Cup footballer.
Paul Burwell, 57, British percussionist.
Ilya Kormiltsev, 47, Russian poet and translator, spinal cancer.
Barbara McNair, 72, American singer and actress, throat cancer.
Jules Olitski, 84, Ukrainian-born American abstract painter and sculptor, cancer.

5
John S. Beckett, 80, Irish musician.
Arthur J. Dixon, 88, Canadian member of the Legislative Assembly of Alberta (1952–1975).
Calvin Henry Glauser, 84, Canadian politician.
Angela King, 68, Jamaican diplomat, Assistant Secretary-General of the United Nations (1997–2004), cancer.
Leo T. McCarthy, 76, New Zealand-born American politician and Lieutenant Governor of California (1983–1995), kidney failure.
Alfred Worm, 61, Austrian investigative journalist, heart attack.

6
Dick Allen, 62, British film editor.
Wolfgang Bartels, 66, German bronze medal-winning Olympic alpine skier (1964).
Lew Burdette, 80, American baseball player, MVP of the 1957 World Series, stomach cancer.
Helen Duncan, 65, New Zealand union leader and politician, cancer.
Doug Gailey, 59, New Zealand rugby league player, complications of a fall.
Lee Hoffman, 74, American science fiction and western writer, heart attack.
Len Hopkins, 76, Canadian politician, Liberal MP from Ontario (1965–1997), pneumonia.
Robert Kimpton, 93, Australian cricketer.
Frankie Laine, 93, American singer ("Mule Train"), complications of hip replacement surgery.
Reiner Merkel, 55, German manager, CEO of German Press Agency Picture Alliance, heart attack.
Nelson W. Polsby, 72, American political scientist and author, heart failure.
Sir Gareth Roberts, 66, British physicist and principal of Wolfson College, Oxford.
Glenn Sarty, 77, Canadian original producer of CBC's The Fifth Estate, Take 30 and Take 60, emphysema.
Bent Skovmand, 61, Danish plant scientist and conservationist, founder of the Svalbard Global Seed Vault, brain tumor.
Harry Webster, 89. British automotive engineer.
Willye White, 68, African American first 5-time U.S. track and field Olympian, pancreatic cancer.

7
Tommy James, 83, American football player with the Cleveland Browns, congestive heart failure.
Ken Kennedy, 61, American computer scientist at Rice University, pancreatic cancer.
Josephine Lenard, 85, American baseball player (AAGPBL).
Alan MacDiarmid, 79, death from a fall off a bridge .
Fred Mustard Stewart, 74, American author, cancer.
Brian Williams, 46, British former rugby union player for Wales and Neath RFC, heart attack.

8
Joe Edwards, 85, American comic book artist best known for his Archie and Li'l Jinx comics, heart failure.
Adele Faccio, 86, Italian civil right activist.
Dick Harding, 72, Canadian Olympic sprinter.
Florence Melton, 95, American inventor, entrepreneur and philanthropist.
Shelby Metcalf, 76, American coach for Texas A&M basketball, cancer.
Ismail Semed, Chinese Muslim Uighur separatist, execution by firing squad.
Anna Nicole Smith, 39, American 1993 Playmate of the Year, widow of J. Howard Marshall, accidental drug overdose.
Ian Stevenson, 88, Canadian psychiatrist and reincarnation researcher.
Peter Thornton, 81, British museum curator and historian.
Harriett Woods, 79, American Lieutenant Governor of Missouri (1985–1989), leukemia.

9
Hank Bauer, 84, American baseball outfielder and manager, three-time All Star, cancer.
Francisco Calamita, 84, Spanish Olympic swimmer.
Eddie Feigner, 81, American softball player, respiratory failure.
Benedict Kiely, 87, Irish writer and broadcaster.
Emil Kiszka, 80, Polish Olympic sprinter.
Andrew McAuley, 39, Australian ocean kayak adventurer, presumed drowned.
Ian Richardson, 72, British actor (House of Cards, Tinker Tailor Soldier Spy) and member of the RSC, in his sleep.
Bruno Ruffo, 86, Italian motorcycle racer, three-time world champion (1949–1951).

10
Bill Clement, 91, Welsh rugby union player and soldier.
Gary Frisch, 38, South African co-founder of Gaydar dating website, fall from balcony.
Jeong Da-bin, 26, South Korean actress, suspected suicide by hanging.
James C. Melby, 57, American professional wrestling historian, author and magazine editor.
Charles S. Swartz, 67, American filmmaker, brain cancer.
Charles R. Walgreen Jr., 100, American president of Walgreens (1939–1971), son of founder Charles R. Walgreen.
Cardis Cardell Willis, 69, American comic.
David Boynton, 61, American historian and photographer, hiking accident.

11
Jorge Antonio, 89, Argentinian Peronist party politician and business man.
Lorentz Eldjarn, 86, Norwegian biochemist.
Marianne Fredriksson, 79, Swedish writer and journalist, heart attack.
Derek Gardner, 92, British marine painter.
Charles Langford, 84, American Alabama state senator and lawyer, represented Rosa Parks during Montgomery bus boycott.
Jules Maenen, 75, Dutch Olympic cyclist.
Yunus Parvez, 75, Indian Bollywood actor, complications of diabetes.
Jim Ricca, 79, American football player (Washington Redskins, Philadelphia Eagles, Detroit Lions), cerebral aneurysm.
Joe Wilkinson, 72, English footballer (Hartlepool United).

12
Violet Barasa, 31, Kenyan women's volleyball team captain and Olympic competitor.
Warren Batchelder, 89, American animator for Warner Bros.
Georg Buschner, 81, East German football coach, prostate cancer.
Jimmy Campbell, 63, British musician.
Valucha deCastro, 77, Brazilian musician, liver disease.
Peter Ellenshaw, 93, English-born American special effects technician (Mary Poppins, The Black Hole) and matte painter (Dick Tracy), Oscar winner (1965).
Thomas E. Fairchild, 94, American Federal Appeals Court Judge.
Peggy Gilbert, 102, American jazz saxophonist and bandleader, complications of hip surgery.
Ellen Hanley, 80, American Broadway theatre actress, stroke.
Joseph Low, 95, American children's book illustrator.
John MacLeod of MacLeod, 71, British 29th chief of the Clan MacLeod, leukaemia.
Joseph McKeown, 82, British photojournalist, after a fall.
Hasan Özbekhan, 86, Turkish economist.
Paolo Pileri, 62, Italian motorcycle racer (1973–1979), 1975 World Champion and Capirossi team manager, natural causes.
Randy Stone, 48, American short film director and casting director (The X-Files), Oscar winner (1995), heart failure.
Sulejman Talović, 18, American Salt Lake City spree killer, shot by police.
Geraldine Warrick-Crisman, 76, African-American TV executive, former assistant New Jersey state treasurer, breast cancer.
Eldee Young, 71, American musician, bass player for  Ramsey Lewis Trio, heart attack.

13
Sir Charles Harington, 96, British general.
Elizabeth Jolley, 83, Australian author, illness.
Bruce M. Metzger, 93, American professor at Princeton Theological Seminary and expert on Greek biblical manuscripts.
Charlie Norwood, 65, American Republican representative from Georgia since 1995, cancer.
Eliana Ramos, 18, Uruguayan model, heart attack caused by anorexia nervosa.
Johanna Sällström, 32, Swedish actress.
Sir Richard Wakeford, 84, British Air Marshal.

14
Ryan Larkin, 63, Canadian animator, Oscar nominee and subject of the Oscar-winning animated short Ryan, lung cancer.
Thomas Marealle, 91, Tanzanian politician and Paramount Chief, pneumonia.
Benito Medero, 84, Uruguayan Minister of Agriculture (1972–1974).
Gareth Morris, 86, British flautist and music teacher.
John O'Banion, 59, American singer and actor, accident causing blunt force trauma.
John Penn, 85, British architect.
Steven Pimlott, 53, British theatre director, lung cancer.
Richard S. Prather, 85, American novelist.
Emmett Williams, 81, American poet and Fluxus artist.

15
Robert Adler, 93, Austrian-born American co-inventor of the TV remote control, heart failure.
Bill Carson, 80, American guitarist.
Walker Edmiston, 81, American voice actor (Transformers, Alvin and the Chipmunks, Dick Tracy), cancer.
Ray Evans, 92, American songwriter, partner of Jay Livingston for hits such as "Buttons and Bows", heart attack.
Stephen Gardiner, 82, British architect.
Buddy Hancken, 92, American baseball player.
Daniel McDonald, 46, American Broadway actor, brain cancer.
Mordkhe Schaechter, 79, American Yiddish linguist and lexicographer.

16
Samararatne Dharmasena, 56, Sri Lankan Olympic sprinter.
Herminio Iglesias, 77, Argentinian Peronist Party politician.
Jakov Lind, 80, Austrian Holocaust survivor and author.
Norman Miscampbell, 81, British politician, Conservative MP for Blackpool North (1962–1992).
Sheridan Morley, 65, British broadcaster and author, heart failure.
Ralph Penza, 74, American senior correspondent and substitute anchor for WNBC.
Lilli Promet, 85, Estonian writer.
Gene Snyder, 79, American Republican representative from Kentucky (1963–1965, 1967–1987).
John G. Truxal, 82, American control theorist.

17
Mike Awesome, 42, American wrestler, twice ECW World Champion, suicide by hanging.
Mehmet Altınsoy, 82, Turkish politician, intracranial hemorrhage.
Mai Ghoussoub, 54, Lebanese author and publisher.
Jurga Ivanauskaitė, 45, Lithuanian writer, cancer.
Mary Kaye, 83, American singer/guitarist and leader of the Mary Kaye Trio, respiratory and heart failure.
Dermot O'Reilly, 64, Irish-born Canadian singer and musician with Ryan's Fancy.
Maurice Papon, 96, French World War II Vichy government official convicted of deporting Jews to Nazi death camps.

18
Lawrence J. Fogel, 78, American computer scientist.
Barbara Gittings, 74, American gay rights campaigner, breast cancer.
Félix Lévitan, 95, French sports journalist and organiser.
Bob Oksner, 90, American comic book artist (Superman, Green Lantern, Captain America), pneumonia.
Frank M. Snowden, Jr, 95, American authority on black people in the ancient world, heart failure.
Juan "Pachín" Vicéns, 72, Puerto Rican basketball player.
Jack Wood (director), 82, American television director.

19
Janet Blair, 85, American actress (My Sister Eileen, The Fabulous Dorseys), complications of pneumonia.
Celia Franca, 85, British-born Canadian dancer, founder and artistic director of the National Ballet of Canada.
Max Hugel, 81, American businessman and political figure, former Deputy Director for Operations of the CIA, cancer.
Antonio Serapio, 69, Philippine congressman representing the city of Valenzuela, car accident resulting from cardiac arrest.

20
Sir John Akehurst, 77, British general.
F. Albert Cotton, 76, American chemist and Texas A&M University professor.
Sir Michael Hart, 58, British judge of the High Court of England and Wales, lung cancer.
Ronald Hilton, 95, American Stanford University professor who helped uncover the Bay of Pigs Invasion plan.
Sir Tap Jones, 92, British air marshal.
Siegfried Landau, 85, American musician and founding conductor of Brooklyn Philharmonic Orchestra, house fire.
Amos Mariani, 75, Italian football player and coach (Fiorentina, A.C. Milan, national team).
Carl-Henning Pedersen, 93, Danish painter known for his membership of CoBrA.
Kenneth Steer, 93, British archaeologist.
Zille Huma Usman, 35, Pakistani minister for social welfare in the Punjab province, shot.
Richard Tom, 86, Chinese-born American weightlifter.
Derek Waring, 79, British actor (Z-Cars), widower of Dame Dorothy Tutin, cancer.
Robert W. Young, 94, American linguist.

21
Daniel Boemle, 36, Swiss disc jockey.
Victor Clemett, 107, Canadian second oldest living veteran of World War I.
Sherman Jones, 72, American baseball player and Kansas state politician.
Jim Kennedy, 74, British cricketer.
Keith Kyle, 81, British journalist, historian and broadcaster.
John Robins, 80, British rugby union player for Wales, coach of the British Lions.
Barry Stevens, 44, American basketball player and second highest scorer in Iowa State University history, heart attack.

22
Avrohom Blumenkrantz, 62, American Orthodox rabbi, posek, and kashrut authority, complications of diabetes.
Lothar-Günther Buchheim, 89, German author (Das Boot), painter and art collector, heart failure.
Irwin Caplan, 87, American cartoonist (Saturday Evening Post, Collier's), Parkinson's disease.
Jozef Dunajovec, 73, Slovak journalist and non-fiction author.
Edgar Evans, 94, British opera singer.
George Jellicoe, 2nd Earl Jellicoe, 88, British soldier, politician and businessman.
Dennis Johnson, 52, American All-Star basketball player and coach, 1979 NBA Finals MVP, cardiac arrest.
Samuel Hinga Norman, 67, Sierra Leone leader of pro-government Kamajors militia, heart failure.
Fons Rademakers, 86, Dutch Academy Award-winning film director (The Assault), emphysema.
Howard Ramsey, 108, American who was one of the last surviving US World War I combat veterans.
George André Robertson, 77, British educator and cricketer.
Ian Wallace, 60, British drummer (King Crimson, 21st Century Schizoid Band), esophageal cancer.

23
Heinz Berggruen, 93, German art collector and friend of Pablo Picasso, heart attack.
Donnie Brooks, 71, American singer ("Mission Bell"), heart failure.
Jock Dodds, 91, British footballer for Scotland and Blackpool F.C.
Robert Engler, 84, American political scientist, heart ailment.
Winthrop Jordan, 75, American historian, amyotrophic lateral sclerosis.
Will Maslow, 99, American Jewish leader and civil rights lawyer.
Robert W. Richardson, 96, American railroad preservationist.
John Ritchie, 65, British footballer for Stoke City F.C., club's record goalscorer.
Pascal Yoadimnadji, 56, Chadian Prime Minister, brain haemorrhage.

24
Bryan Balkwill, 84, British conductor.
Bruce Bennett, 100, American actor (New Adventures of Tarzan, Treasure of the Sierra Madre), 1928 Olympic medallist, hip fracture.
Kåre Olav Berg, 62, Norwegian Olympic Nordic skier.
Mordechai Breuer, 85, Israeli Bible researcher and Orthodox rabbi.
Mario Chanes de Armas, 80, Cuban political prisoner.
Charles Frederick Ehret, 83, American molecular biologist.
Leroy Jenkins, 74, American composer and free jazz violinist, lung cancer.
Lamar Lundy, 71, American football player, member of the Los Angeles Rams' "Fearsome Foursome" defensive line.
Damien Nash, 24, American football running back for the Denver Broncos.
George Preas, 73, American football lineman who won two NFL championships with the Baltimore Colts, Parkinson's disease.
Paul Secon, 91, American businessman who founded Pottery Barn.

25
P. Bhaskaran, 83, Indian director and lyricist in the Malayalam language.
Jean Grelaud, 108, French WWI veteran, one of the last three 'official' World War I veterans.
Mark Spoelstra, 66, American folk singer and veteran of the Greenwich Village music scene, pancreatic cancer.

26
John Robert Anderson, 78, Australian chemist.
Angelo Arcidiacono, 51, Italian Olympic fencer.
Raúl Alonso de Marco, 72, Uruguayan member of the Supreme Court of Justice (1992–2002).
James O. Hall, 96, American historian.
Alex Henshaw, 94, British test pilot noted for his work with Spitfire and Lancaster aircraft.
Baroness Jeger, 91, British Labour MP for Holborn and St Pancras South and opposition spokesman in the House of Lords.
David McGuire, 75, Australian cricketer.
Sergio Previtali, 66, Uruguayan politician and former deputy (1990–1995).

27
Brian Belle, 92, English cricketer.
Russell Churney, 42, British pianist, pancreatic cancer.
Bernd Freytag von Loringhoven, 93, German World War II General, survivor of Hitler's bunker.
Wayne Hooper, 86, American music composer, arranger and singer.
Jack Marks, 80, Canadian Chief of Metro Toronto Police (1984–1989), pancreatic cancer.
Elbie Nickel, 84, American football player.
Bobby Rosengarden, 82, American jazz drummer and bandleader on The Dick Cavett Show, kidney failure.
Mel Swart, 87, Canadian politician, stroke.
Judith Toups, 76, American birding expert and Sun Herald columnist.

28
Julian Budden, 82, British opera scholar.
Charles Forte, Baron Forte, 98, British hotelier.
Alexander King, 98, British scientist who co-founded the Club of Rome.
Robert Kingston, 78, American Army general, complications from a fall.
Alexei Komech, 70, Russian architectural historian, cancer.
Princess Marie Adelaide of Luxembourg, 82, Luxembourgish princess.
Arthur M. Schlesinger Jr., 89, American historian and Pulitzer Prize-winning author, heart attack.
Sir John Smith, 83, British founder of the Landmark Trust.
Billy Thorpe, 60, Australian rock musician, cardiac arrest.

References

2007-02
 02